Sheela (Hindi :  शीला) is a Hindi Indian popular feminine given name, which means "character" and "good conduct".

Notable people named Sheela 
 Sheela Bhattarika, a 9th-century Sanskrit poet from India
 Sheela (born March 22, 1945), Indian actress
 Sheela Basrur (October 17, 1956 – June 2, 2008), Canadian physician
 Sheela Gautam (November 15, 1931 - June 8, 2019), Indian politician
 Sheela Gowda (born 1957), Indian contemporary artist and feminist
 Sheela Kaur (born August 2, 1989), Indian actress
 Sheela Lambert (born 1956), American civil rights activist and writer
 Sheela Murthy (born 1961), American-Indian lawyer
 Sheela Patel (born 1952), Indian urban planner

Fictional characters 
 Sheela Peryroyl, from Gary Gygax and Dave Arneson's tabletop role-playing game, Dungeons & Dragons
 Sheela, a recurring character in the Disney Channel TV series The Ghost and Molly McGee

Hindu given names
Indian feminine given names